Lana Marconi (born Ecaterina Ileana Marcovici; 8 September 1917 in Bucharest, Romania – 8 December 1990) was a Romanian-French actress, and the fifth and last wife of the famous French actor-director-playwright Sacha Guitry (1885–1957), whom she married in 1949. She appeared exclusively in her husband's films.

Filmography

References

External links

Romanian film actresses
French film actresses
1917 births
1990 deaths
20th-century Romanian actresses
20th-century French actresses
Romanian emigrants to France